The 1971 Cork Junior Hurling Championship was the 74th staging of the Cork Junior Hurling Championship since its establishment by the Cork County Board. The championship ran from 24 October to 12 December 1971.

On 12 December 1971, Bandon won the championship following a 3-12 to 4-05 defeat of Ballinhassig in the final at Ballinspittle GAA Grounds. This was their third championship title overall and their first title since 1949.

Ballinhassig's Derry Coleman was the championship's top scorer with 5-14.

Results

Quarter-finals

Semi-finals

Final

Championship statistics

Top scorers

Overall

In a single game

Miscellaneous

 A fire at the Bandon clubhouse on the previous day resulted in the team wearing the Carbery colours for their quarter-final meeting with Meelin.

References

Cork Junior Hurling Championship
Cork Junior Hurling Championship